The Kehrwegstadion is a multi-purpose stadium in Eupen, Belgium. It is mainly used for football matches and hosts the home matches of K.A.S. Eupen of the Belgian First Division. The stadium has a capacity of 8,363   of which 5,603 are seats and 2,760 are standing places. The stadium was a venue of the 2007 European Under-17 Football Championship .

References

External links
Stadium website

Multi-purpose stadiums in Belgium
Football venues in Wallonia
Sports venues in Liège Province
Buildings and structures in the German-speaking Community of Belgium
Eupen